Van Nuys Assembly was a General Motors automobile factory in Van Nuys, California. The plant opened in 1947 producing Chevrolet Advance Design trucks. Later it would produce several different models including Chevrolet full-size (Caprice, Impala, etc.), Chevrolet Corvair, Chevrolet Greenbrier, Chevrolet Chevelle, Chevrolet Nova/Buick Apollo/Oldsmobile Omega/Pontiac Ventura, and Chevrolet Camaro/Pontiac Firebird. It also produced the Chevrolet Monte Carlo and the Buick Skylark. The plant was closed in 1992 when Camaro/Firebird production moved to Sainte-Thérèse Assembly in Quebec due to air quality remediation efforts.

The site was razed in 1993. A retail and industrial complex, known as The Plant, resulted on the  site, as well as Station 81 of the Los Angeles Fire Department. The retail portion totals  and is home to 35 retail stores and restaurants.  A 16-screen movie theater honors the site history with an automotive theme décor.

References

General Motors factories
Former motor vehicle assembly plants
Motor vehicle assembly plants in California
Manufacturing companies based in Los Angeles
Van Nuys, Los Angeles
Industrial buildings completed in 1947
Vehicle manufacturing companies established  in 1947
Vehicle manufacturing companies disestablished  in 1992
1947 establishments in California
1992 disestablishments in California
Defunct companies based in Greater Los Angeles
San Fernando Valley
Buildings and structures demolished in 1998
Demolished buildings and structures in California